Warren Benbow (born December 22, 1954, in New York City) is a  drummer who has worked with Nina Simone, Jimmy Owens, Larry Willis, Eddie Gómez, Olu Dara, Michael Urbaniak, Teruo Nakamura, and was an original member of James Blood Ulmer's band 'Odyssey'.

Career
At the High School of Performing Arts, Benbow studied drums and percussion with Warren Smith and Morris Goldenberg of the New York Philharmonic. Later at Mannes College he studied with Walter Rosenberger, also of the Phil, and with Dong Wong Park.

While studying in the Jazzmobile with Freddie Waits and Albert “Tootie” Heath Benbow was introduced by Waits to jazz vocalist Betty Carter, and his career as a professional drummer began. He toured with Ulmer and played on Ulmer's albums Odyssey, Bloody Guitar, Part Time,  
Live At The Caravan Of Dreams, and Reunion. In addition to his jazz work, he has also worked on Broadway, and has also worked in pop with Whitney Houston, Gwen Guthrie, LL Cool J, SWV, and Mary J. Blige.

In 2011 Benbow toured Europe with Ulmer's reformed band, 'Odyssey'.

Discography
with Luther Thomas
 yo' Momma (Moers Music)
With James Blood Ulmer
Odyssey (Columbia, 1983)
 Part Time (Rough Trade, 1984)
Live at the Caravan of Dreams (Caravan of Dreams, 1985)
Reunion (Knitting Factory, 1998) - as Odyssey the Band
Back in Time (Pi, 2005) - as Odyssey the Band
Blues Odyssey (American Revelation Music, 2010)
With Larry Willis
Inner Crisis (Groove Merchant, 1973)

External links
 Warren Benbow, allaboutjazz.com
 "Drummer reunites with Ulmer" allaboutjazz.com, May 2005
 James Blood Ulmer discography

1954 births
Jazz drummers
Living people
Musicians from New York City
20th-century American drummers
American male drummers
Jazz musicians from New York (state)
20th-century American male musicians
American male jazz musicians
American jazz drummers